David S. Jones is a British writer from London, England, who created the concept of the children's television series Fireman Sam, with Dave Gingell, after purchasing a picture drawn by artist Anthony Miller.

In 2012, Jones was detained for an hour at Gatwick Airport following concerns over an allegedly racist remark.

Books 
Trevelyan, November 2013 Austin Macauley Publishers,

References

British writers
Living people
Year of birth missing (living people)